The Nabongo Cultural Centre and Shrine is a shrine and cultural centre dedicated to the Wanga Kingdom of the Luhya people in Kenya. The shrine contains the tombs of Wanga kings or Nabongo are buried, including the founder of Mumias, Nabongo Mumia. Locally known as Eshiembekho, the shrine is managed by the Luhya Council of Elders.

The centre was officially opened on December 13, 2008 by reigning Nabongo, Peter Shitawa Mumia II and former president of Kenya, Raila Odinga. The site contains various structures on the 12-acres of land: a royal mausoleum, cultural centre, museum, library, bar and restaurant.

Mausoleum

The Mausoleum holds the tombs of past Wanga kings: Nabongo Wamukoya, Nabongo Shiundu, Nabongo Shitawa and Nabongo Mumia. The grave of Nabongo Wanga, the first leader and founding father of the Wanga kingdom, is separated from the four on a nearby burial mound dating back to the 12th century.

Cultural centre

The site contains a traditional Luhya homestead utilised as a cultural and community hub. Here, traditional customs are carried out including the production of busaa, a local fermented drink.

Library and Museum
A modern building stands next to the mausoleum with a library and a museum displaying Wanga traditional artifacts including Nabongo Mumia's royal regalia, weapons and traditional farming equipment. The museum also holds the first Kenyan flag flown by Joseph Thomson in 1883.

See also
 Luhya people
 Luhya languages
 Mumias
 Wanga Kingdom
 Wanga

References

Bantu peoples
History of Kenya
British Kenya
Colonialism